"Time's Arrow" is the eleventh episode of the fourth season of the American animated television series BoJack Horseman. It was written by Kate Purdy and directed by Aaron Long. The episode was released in the United States, along with the rest of season four, via Netflix on September 8, 2017. Matthew Broderick, Majandra Delfino, and Wendie Malick provide voices in guest appearances in the episode.

The episode follows a non-linear structure, looking at the life of BoJack Horseman's mother, Beatrice, and her battle with dementia and deteriorating health.

In February 2018, "Time's Arrow" won the Writers Guild of America Award for Television: Animation at the 70th WGA Awards.

Plot 

Through Beatrice's fuzzy memories, it is revealed how her father (Matthew Broderick) pushed her toward a potential suitor, whom she spurns in favor of the dashing aspiring writer, Butterscotch Horseman. She becomes pregnant by Butterscotch, marries him, and they move to San Francisco. Their marriage falters as their dreams fail to pan out; she becomes unhappy and bitter, and both drink heavily and take out their frustrations on BoJack. Butterscotch later has an affair with a maid named Henrietta, an aspiring nurse. Beatrice convinces Henrietta to give up the baby for adoption so that she can continue in nursing school. Hollyhock is thus revealed not to be BoJack's daughter, as previously assumed, but his half-sister.

Reception 
"Time's Arrow" received critical acclaim from critics, many of whom described it as one of the best episodes of the season. Les Chappell of The A.V. Club, who gave the episode an "A", wrote that there was "no episode of television to simultaneously anticipate and dread more in the year than ["Time's Arrow"]. Julia Alexander, writing for Polygon, described "Time's Arrow" as "TV's best episode of 2017". In The Atlantic, Lenika Cruz noted the episode's effectiveness at its portrayal of female characters.

References

External links 
 "Time's Arrow" on Netflix
 

BoJack Horseman episodes
2017 American television episodes
Works about dementia